Mordon is a village in County Durham, England. It is situated a few miles to the north-east of Newton Aycliffe. The population recorded by the 2011 census was 260.

In 1872 the population was 179. It is part of the historical parish of Sedgefield, but part of the modern parish of Mordon.

References

External links

 Listed buildings in Mordon, Durham - British Listed Buildings

Villages in County Durham